Park West is a neighborhood of Greater Downtown, Miami, Florida. It is roughly bound by Biscayne Boulevard to the east, West (NW) First Avenue to the west, North (NE/NW) 7th Street to the south and Interstate 395 to the north.  As of 2010, about 4,655 residents live in Park West. The neighborhood is named 'Park West' due to its location just west of Museum Park.

Future development
Much of the neighborhood west of the Metromover will be developed into Miami World Center, a major urban center containing a convention center, hotel, residential condo towers, and 765,000 square feet of retail. Plans for an enclosed Mall at Miami WorldCenter anchored by Bloomingdales and Macy's, have been replaced in favor of an open air promenade shopping district. Demolition of buildings making up the former "club row" began in 2015 clearing the way for construction to begin.

Transportation
Park West is served by Miami-Dade Transit via Metrobus along major thoroughfares, and by the Miami Metrorail and Metromover at:

Metrorail:
   Government Center (Northwest First Street and First Avenue)
   Historic Overtown/Lyric Theatre (Northwest Eighth Street and First Avenue)

Metromover:
  Downtown/Inner Loop
  Omni Loop

References

Neighborhoods in Miami
Entertainment districts in Florida